Heather Kafka (born July 7, 1972 in Austin, Texas) is an American film, television, and voice actress who is known for playing Chloe in the television sitcom series Austin Stories, Lacy in the independent drama film Joe, and Henrietta Hewitt in the slasher film The Texas Chainsaw Massacre (2003). As a voice actress for ADV Films, her roles have included Hinagiku Tamano/Angel Daisy in the anime Wedding Peach and Jun Hunoo in the anime Mazinkaiser.

Filmography

Live action
About Mom and Dad... - Raye
Ain't Them Bodies Saints - Midwife #1
Angels Sing - David's Doctor
Austin Stories - Chloe 
Beyond the Prairie: The True Story of Laura Ingalls Wilder Part 2 - Beth Maguson
Black Metal (2013 short - Rose
Blind (2004 short - Anne Campbell
Bug (2017 film) — Emily
CSI: Crime Scene Investigation - Mindy DuPont
CSI: NY - Ophelia Dichara
Daylight's End - Earnesta
Drawback (2010 short) - Suze
Don't Ever Change (2017 short) - Amy
ER (tv series) - Rhonda
Friday Night Lights - Doreen Sproles
From Dusk Till Dawn: The Series - Madame Diana
Going to California (TV series) - Sandy
House (tv series) - Sarah Kelvey 
Huff (TV series) - Dr. Emily Dawson
Hysteria (TV series) - Val Young
Idiocracy - Woman at Carl Jr's
Jenny And Steph (short film) - Mom
Joe (2013 film) - Lacy
Kid-Thing - Mom
Leftovers (2014 short film)- Her
Longmire (TV series) - Holly Whitish
Long Time Gone (2011 short film)- Lauren
Love and Air Sex - Alamo Employee
Lovers of Hate - Diana
Loves Her Gun - Debbie
Meet Jane - Lauren
Movie Picture Makers - Girl
Murder in the Heartland - Carol King
Natural Selection (1999 film) - Cassandra
Night Stalker (TV series) - Katrina Ortega
Pit Stop (2013 film) - Linda
Sacked (2012 short) - Jane
Saturday Morning Mystery - Mona Kyser
Skip Tracer - Attorney Michelle McGann
Skunk (2014 short) - Leila's mom
Slacker 2011 - Robber Gang Leader
Some Beasts - Rene
Song to Song - Suzie
Strong Medicine - Callan Howe
That Day - Mother
The Last Note - Emily
The Leftovers (TV series) - Susan
The Man Who Never Cried - Mary Winston
The People Next Door (1996 film) - Woman in Park
The Samaritans - Lou-Anne
The Secret She Carried - Cheryl
The Texas Chainsaw Massacre (2003 film) - Henrietta Hewitt
The Wendell Baker Story - Marianne
Three Days of Rain - Lisa
Where the Heart Is - Delphia 
Whiskey Fist - Karen
Wind Session Tiger Woman - Mrs. BlakeWuss (2013 film) - State Board LadyWomen in Law - Guest Star

AnimeDevil Lady - NorikoKing of Bandit Jing - Rose (ep.2)Mazinkaiser - Jun HonoWedding Peach - Hinagiku Tamano/Angel Daisy, FreesiaWedding Peach DX'' - Hinagiku Tamano/Angel Daisy

Video games
Deus Ex: Invisible War - Billie Adams

References

External links

American film actresses
American television actresses
Living people
1972 births
21st-century American women